"Okay!" is a song by Dave Dee, Dozy, Beaky, Mick & Tich, released as a single in May 1967. It peaked at number 4 on the UK Singles Chart.

Reception
Reviewing for Record Mirror, Peter Jones wrote that "there's a Russian approach to this" and "the scene builds well, into some jerky lyrics by the Howard Blaikley team. I don't say it's their strongest... but I do say it'll be around longer than most pop records". Penny Valentine for Disc and Music Echo wrote that the writers "really are getting to sound as though they plough through Israel and Russian folk music libraries week in week out before writing a new song. This has the inimitable team, Dave Dee, etc., singing as though they should be leaping about collective farms with much hey heying in fierce style". Melody Maker described it as "commercial, full of hang-ups, and a nice mystical chanting at the beginning, but then it clunks along at a rather boring pace, getting nowhere slowly".

Track listing
7": Fontana / TF 830
 "Okay!" – 2:37
 "He's a Raver" – 2:06

7": Fontana / F-1591 (US)
 "Okay" – 2:35
 "Master Llewellyn" – 2:23

Charts

References

1967 singles
1967 songs
Fontana Records singles
Songs written by Alan Blaikley
Songs written by Ken Howard (composer)
Song recordings produced by Steve Rowland